59th Brigade or 59th Infantry Brigade may refer to:

 59th Indian Brigade of the British Indian Army in the First World War
 59th Mixed Brigade of the Spanish Republican Army
 59th Brigade (United Kingdom)
 59th Ordnance Brigade of the United States Army
 59th Ordnance Brigade of the United States Army
 59th Motorized Brigade (Ukraine)

See also

 59th Division (disambiguation)